"Mercy" is a song performed by American contemporary worship bands Elevation Worship and Maverick City Music, which features vocals from Chris Brown. The song was released as the eleventh track of the collaborative album, Old Church Basement on April 30, 2021. The song was written by Brandon Lake, Chris Brown, and Steven Furtick.

"Mercy" debuted at No. 18 on the US Hot Christian Songs chart, and at No. 6 on the Hot Gospel Songs chart, despite not being released as an official single.

Composition
The lyrics of the song are testimonial, as the singer affirms that "that Jesus is alive in us and that He has rescued us from the grave."

Critical reception
Joshua Andre, reviewing for 365 Days of Inspiring Media, gave a favorable opinion of the song, describing the song as potential radio single and future Sunday morning staple, further saying, "we are met with a testimony type track that is sure to win over listeners and critics alike."

Commercial performance
Following the release of the album, "Mercy" made its debut at No. 18 on the US Hot Christian Songs chart, and at No. 6 on the Hot Gospel Songs chart, both dated May 15, 2021.

Music videos
On April 30, 2021, Elevation Worship published the lyric video of the song on YouTube.

On May 6, 2021, Elevation Worship released the official music video of "Mercy" on their YouTube channel. The video shows Chris Brown leading the song.

Charts

Weekly charts

Year-end charts

References

External links
 

2021 songs
Elevation Worship songs
Maverick City Music songs
Songs written by Jason Ingram
Songs written by Dante Bowe